This is a list of past and present personalities associated with the Food Network Canada television network.

A
Hugh Acheson, Iron Chef on Iron Chef Canada
Nobu Adilman, one of three hosts of Food Jammers
David Adjey, makes several appearances as a chef on Restaurant Makeover
Michael Allemeier, host of Cook Like a Chef
Ted Allen, a judge on season three of Top Chef, frequent judge on Iron Chef America, host of Food Detectives and Chopped
Camila Alves, co-hosted Kids BBQ Championship
Sunny Anderson co-hosts The Kitchen, and hosts Cooking For Real, and hosted of How'd That Get On My Plate?, and more
Thea Andrews, host of Top Chef Canada
Shereen Arazm, resident judge on Top Chef Canada

B
Mario Batali, has hosted Malto Mario, Ciao America with Mario Batali, Mario, Full Boil, and was an Iron Chef on Iron Chef America
Ned Bell, has made appearances on Cook Like a Chef
Valerie Bertinelli, hosts Valerie's Home Cooking and co-hosts Kids Baking Championship
Richard Blais, frequent judge on Guy's Grocery Games
Bob Blumer creator/host of Surreal Gourmet and Glutton for Punishment
Brian Boitano hosted of What Would Brian Boitano Make?
Michael Bonacini
Anthony Bourdain, hosted of A Cook's Tour
Kevin Brauch, floor reporter on Iron Chef America and hosted The Thirsty Traveler
Alton Brown, presenter on Iron Chef America and hosts Good Eats; hosted Cutthroat Kitchen, Feasting on Asphalt, and more
Anne Burrell, rotating mentor on Worst Cooks in America and frequent judge on Beat Bobby Flay; hosted Secrets of a Restaurant Chef, Chef Wanted with Anne Burrell, and Vegas Chef Prizefight

C
Laura Calder, hosted French Food at Home
Noah Cappe, host of Carnival Eats and Wall of Chefs, co-hosted The Great Canadian Cookbook
Massimo Capra, was a rotating a chef on Restaurant Makeover
John Catucci, hosted You Gotta Eat Here! and Big Food Bucket List
Michael Chiarello, frequent judge on Chopped
Maneet Chauhan, frequent judge on Chopped
Tom Colicchio, head judge on the show Top Chef
Scott Conant, frequent judge on Chopped
Cat Cora, former Iron Chef on Iron Chef America 
Chris Cosentino co-host of Chefs vs. City
Lynn Crawford, Iron Chef on Iron Chef Canada and rotating judge on Wall of Chefs, former rotating chef on Restaurant Makeover, frequent judge on Chopped Canada, hosted Pitchin' In, and co-hosted The Great Canadian Cookbook
Madison Cowan, occasional judge on Guy's Grocery Games
Christine Cushing, hosted Christine Cushing Live and Cook With Me

D
Melissa d'Arabian, frequent judge on Guy's Grocery Games
Mark Dacascos, the "Chairman" on Iron Chef America
Giada De Laurentiis
Bobby Deen, co-hosted of Road Tasted and was the first host of both Spring Baking Championship and Holiday Baking Championship
Jamie Deen, co-hosted of Road Tasted
Paula Deen
Clarissa Dickson Wright, former co-host of Two Fat Ladies
Matt Dunigan, hosted of Road Grill
George Duran

E
Gordon Elliott, hosted of Gordon Elliot's Doorknock Dinners
Ethan Erickson hosted of Chefs vs. City
Duskie Estes, occasional judge on Guy's Grocery Games

F
Tiffani Faison, occasional judge on Chopped
Rob Feenie
Guy Fieri, hosts Guy's Grocery Games and Diners, Drive-Ins and Dives; hosted Guy's Big Bite
Bobby Flay
Tyler Florence
Tregaye Fraser, was a rotating chef on Kitchen Sink
Marc Forgione, Iron Chef on Iron Chef America
Amanda Freitag, frequent judge on Chopped

G
Ina Garten, Barefoot Contessa
Nadia Giosia, hosted of Bitchin' Kitchen
Duff Goldman, hosted of Ace of Cakes
Alex Guarnaschelli

H
Carla Hall, judge on Holiday Baking Championship
Patricia Heaton, Patricia Heaton Parties
Meredith Heron, designer on Restaurant Makeover
Chuck Hughes, hosted of Chuck's Day Off

I
Stephanie Izard, Iron Chef on Iron Chef America

J
Eddie Jackson, co-hosted Kids BBQ Championship
Katie Lee Joel, hosted season one of Top Chef
Troy Johnson, frequent judge on Guy's Grocery Games
Judy Joo, Iron Chef on Iron Chef UK, occasional judge on Guy's Grocery Games, resident judge on The Next Iron Chef, and more

K
Clinton Kelly, hosted Spring Baking Championship
Ken Kostick
Kylie Kwong

L
Emeril Lagasse
Padma Lakshmi, host of Top Chef starting at season two
Ricardo Larrivée, host of Ricardo and Friends
Nigella Lawson, hosts or has hosted Nigella Bites, Forever Summer with Nigella, and others
Susur Lee, Iron Chef on Iron Chef Canada, was a chef on one episode of Restaurant Makeover, and frequent judge on Chopped Canada
Dave Lieberman
Brad Long, was a rotating chef on Restaurant Makeover
Pete Luckett

M
Beau MacMillan, frequent judge on Guy's Grocery Games, and was a mentor on season 1 of Worst Cooks in America
Angie Mar, occasional judge on Chopped
James Martin, host of Sweet Baby James
Jeff Mauro, co-host of The Kitchen, hosted Sandwich King and $24 in 24, and was a rotating chef on Kitchen Sink
Catherine McCord, frequent judge on Guy's Grocery Games
Dean McDermott, first host of Chopped Canada
Mark McEwan, star of The Heat with Mark McEwan and head judge on Top Chef Canada
Spike Mendelsohn, was a rotating chef on Kitchen Sink
Robin Miller, host of Quick Fix Meals with Robin Miller
Aida Mollenkamp occasional judge on Guy's Grocery Games and hosted Ask Aida
Roger Mooking, hosted Everyday Exotic, was a frequent judge on Chopped Canada, and was an occasional guest judge on Kids BBQ Championship
Masaharu Morimoto, Iron Chef Japanese
Sara Moulton, hosted Sara's Secrets and Sara Moulton Live
Marc Murphy, frequent judge on Chopped, judge on Beat Bobby Flay, judge on Iron Chef America, and more

N
Nadia Giosia, hosted of Bitchin' Kitchen

O

Jim O'Connor, hosted The Secret Life Of...
Jamie Oliver, hosts or has hosted Naked Chef, Jamie at Home, Oliver's Twist, among others
Anna Olson, hosts Bake with Anna Olson, Iron Chef on Iron Chef Canada; hosted/co-hosted Kitchen Equipped, Sugar, and Fresh with Anna Olson

P
Jesse Palmer, hosted Spring Baking Championship and Spring Baking Championship
Lorraine Pascale, judge on Spring Baking Championship and Spring Baking Championship and mentor on Worst Bakers in America
Jennifer Patterson, co-hosted of Two Fat Ladies
Damaris Phillips, frequent judge on Guy's Grocery Games, hosted Southern at Heart and  co-host Kids BBQ Championship
Martin Picard, hosted of Chef Wild
Greta Podleski, co-hosted of Eat, Shrink and Be Merry
Janet Podleski, co-hosted of Eat, Shrink and Be Merry
Wolfgang Puck, former Iron Chef on Iron Chef America
Jay Purvis, co-hosted Kitchen Equipped

R
Rachael Ray, hosts 30 Minute Meals and has hosted $40 a Day, Inside Dish, Rachael Ray's Tasty Travels
Gordon Ramsay
Rob Rainford, hosted License to Grill
Bobby Rivers, hosted Top 5
David Rocco
Carlo Rota
Guy Rubino

S
Marcus Samuelsson, frequent judge on Chopped
Aarón Sánchez, frequent judge on Chopped and co-star of Chefs vs. City
Chris Santos, frequent judge on Chopped
Anthony Sedlak, hosted The Main
Gail Simmons, presenter on Iron Chef Canada
Brad Smith, second host of Chopped Canada
Michael Smith, was a frequent judge on Chopped Canada; hosted Chef at Home, Chef at Large, Chef Abroad, and The Inn Chef
Aarti Sequeira, frequent judge on Guy's Grocery Games and hosted Arti Party
Noah Starr co-hosted Ask Aida during season one as the tech guru
Martha Stewart
Marc Summers, original host of Unwrapped, occasional judge on Guy's Grocery Games, and was a co-host of Ultimate Recipe Showdown
Michael Symon, competed on The Next Iron Chef, is an Iron Chef on Iron Chef America, and second host of Dinner: Impossible

T
Jet Tila, judge on many shows including Chopped, Beat Bobby Flay, Guy's Grocery Games, and more
Corbin Tomaszeski, hosted Crash My Kitchen, judge on Dinner Party Wars, and one of the chefs on Restaurant Makeover
Jacques Torres
Ming Tsai, hosted East Meets West
Anthea Turner, judge on Dinner Party Wars

V
Marcela Valladolid, frequent judge on Guy's Grocery Games, former co-host of The Kitchen, and was a rotating chef on Kitchen Sink

Y
Martin Yan, hosted Martin Yan's Chinatown
Trisha Yearwood, Trisha's Southern Kitchen

W
Justin Warner, frequent judge on Guy's Grocery Games,

Z
Geoffrey Zakarian, hosts Cooks vs. Cons, co-hosts The Kitchen, rotating judge on Chopped, and more
Julie Zwillich

See also
Food Network Canada
List of programs broadcast by Food Network Canada

Personalities